The 2020–21 Sheffield United Football Club season was the club's 132nd season in existence and the club's 2nd consecutive season in the top flight of English football. In addition to the domestic league, Sheffield United participated in this season's editions of the FA Cup and the EFL Cup.

Sheffield United suffered a disastrous start to the season. With just 5 points in their first 19 fixtures, Sheffield United set a record for the worst-ever Premier League start not including administrative point deductions. They also broke the Premier League record of most consecutive games without a win to start the season, with 17. Previously, the record was held by the 2012–13 Queens Park Rangers squad. 

Things marginally improved after Matchday 18, when Sheffield United defeated Newcastle United 1–0 on 12 January 2021 at Bramall Lane. Two further wins followed, including a shock away win against Manchester United. However, Sheffield United remained bottom of the table and they were eventually officially relegated on 17 April 2021 following a 1–0 away defeat at Wolves - thus ending the Blades' two-year status in the English top flight. The team manager Chris Wilder resigned towards the end of the season, following reported clashes with the club ownership and board. He was replaced by interim manager Paul Heckingbottom (previously under 23's manager).

Kits

Squad

Appearances and goals
Updated 23 May 2021

|-
! colspan=14 style=background:#DCDCDC; text-align:center| Goalkeepers
 

|-
! colspan=14 style=background:#DCDCDC; text-align:center| Defenders

|-
! colspan=14 style=background:#DCDCDC; text-align:center| Midfielders

|-
! colspan=14 style=background:#DCDCDC; text-align:center| Forwards

|-
!colspan=14|Player(s) out on loan:

|-
|}

Goals

Transfers

Transfers in

Loans in

Loans out

Transfers out

Pre-season and friendlies

Competitions

Overview

Premier League

League table

Results summary

Results by matchday

Matches
The 2020–21 season fixtures were released on 20 August.

FA Cup

EFL Cup

Notes

References

External links

Sheffield United F.C. seasons
Sheffield United F.C.